Lynne Cox (born January 2, 1957) is an American long-distance open-water swimmer, writer and speaker. She is best known for being the first person to swim between the United States and the Soviet Union, in the Bering Strait, a feat which has been recognized for easing the Cold War tensions between US President Ronald Reagan and Soviet leader Mikhail Gorbachev.

Achievements
In 1971, she and her teammates were the first group of teenagers to complete the crossing of the Catalina Island Channel in California. She has twice held the record for the fastest crossing of the English Channel from England to France (1972 in a time of 9 hours 57 minutes and 1973 in a time of 9 hours 36 minutes). In 1975, Cox became the first woman to swim the 10 °C (50 °F), 16 km (10 mi) Cook Strait in New Zealand. In 1976, she was the first person to swim the Straits of Magellan in Chile, and the first to swim around the Cape of Good Hope in South Africa.

At the time people living on the Diomede Islands, only 3.7 km (2.3 mi) apart, were not permitted to travel between them, although the Inuit communities there had been closely linked until the natives of Big Diomede were moved to the Russian mainland after World War II. Her accomplishment a few years before the end of the Cold War earned praise from both US President Ronald Reagan and Soviet leader Mikhail Gorbachev.

At the signing of the INF Missile Treaty at the White House, Gorbachev made a toast. He and President Reagan lifted their glasses and Gorbachev said: "Last summer it took one brave American by the name of Lynne Cox just two hours to swim from one of our countries to the other. We saw on television how sincere and friendly the meeting was between our people and the Americans when she stepped onto the Soviet shore. She proved by her courage how close to each other our peoples live".

In May 1992, Lynne Cox swam in the Andean Lake Titicaca, which, at 3,812 m (12,507 feet) elevation, is considered the world's highest navigable lake.  While Titicaca's water, at 13-14 °C (56-58 °F), is warmer than that of the Bering Strait, the high elevation and unidentified biting creatures offered an unusual challenge. The swimmer covered the distance of around 10 miles from Copacabana, Bolivia, to the village of Chimbo, Peru, in 3 hours 48 minutes. The Bolivian Navy provided support boats.

Another of her accomplishments was swimming more than a mile (1.6 km) in the waters of Antarctica. Cox was in the water for 25 min, swimming 1.22 miles (1.96 km). Her book about the experience, Swimming to Antarctica, was published in 2004.

Her second book, Grayson, details her encounter with a lost baby gray whale during an early morning workout off the coast of California. It was published in 2006.

In August 2006, joined by local swimmers, Lynne Cox swam across the Ohio River in Cincinnati from the Serpentine Wall to Newport, Kentucky, to bring attention to plans to decrease the water-quality standards for the Ohio River.

In 2011, she published South with the Sun, both a biography of Roald Amundsen and a chronicle of her 2007 swimming expedition to Greenland, Baffin Island and Alaska, tracing Amundsen's Northwest Passage expedition.

Works
 Swimming to Antarctica, Alfred A. Knopf, 2004 
 Grayson, Alfred A. Knopf, 2006 
 South with the Sun, Alfred A. Knopf, 2011 
 Open Water Swimming Manual: An Expert's Survival Guide For Triathletes And Open Water Swimmers, Knopf Doubleday Publishing Group, 2013 
 Elizabeth, Queen of the Seas", Schwartz & Wade, 2014 
 Swimming in the Sink: An Episode of the Heart, Alfred A. Knopf, September 2016, 
 Tales of Al: The Water Rescue Dog'', Alfred A. Knopf, 2022,

Awards and honors
 2014 California Book Awards Juvenile Finalist for "Elizabeth, Queen of the Seas" 
 2015 Irma Black Award Honor
 The asteroid 37588 Lynnecox was named in her honor.

See also
 List of members of the International Swimming Hall of Fame

References

External links
 Lynne Cox's website

American long-distance swimmers
English Channel swimmers
Cook Strait swimmers
1957 births
Living people
American female swimmers
Swimmers from Massachusetts
UC Santa Barbara Gauchos women's swimmers
People from Boston